Format of entries is:
 ICAO (IATA) – Airport Name – Airport Location

NC - Cook Islands 

 NCAI (AIT) – Aitutaki Airport (Araura Airport) – Aitutaki (Araura)
 NCAT (AIU) – Enua Airport – Atiu (Enua Manu)
 NCMG (MGS) – Mangaia Airport – Mangaia (Auau Enua)
 NCMH (MHX) – Manihiki Island Airport – Manihiki (Humphrey Island)
 NCMK (MUK) – Mauke Airport – Mauke (Akatoka Manava)
 NCMN – Manuae Airstrip (disused) – Manuae Island
 NCMR (MOI) – Mitiaro Airport (Nukuroa Airport) – Mitiaro (Nukuroa)
 NCPK (PZK) – Pukapuka Island Airfield – Pukapuka
 NCPY (PYE) – Tongareva Airport – Penrhyn Island (Tongareva)
 NCRG (RAR) – Rarotonga International Airport – Avarua, Rarotonga

NF - Fiji, Tonga

Fiji

 NFCI (ICI) – Cicia Airport – Cicia
 NFCS (CST) – Castaway Island Airport – Castaway Island (Qalito), Mamanuca Islands
 NFFA (BFJ) – Ba Airport – Ba, Viti Levu
 NFFN (NAN) – Nadi International Airport – Nadi, Viti Levu
 NFFO (PTF) – Malolo Lailai Airport – Malolo Lailai
 NFFR (RBI) – Rabi Airport – Rabi
 NFKB – Kaibu Airport– Kaibu
 NFKD (KDV) – Vunisea Airport – Vunisea (Namalata), Kadavu
 NFMA (MNF) – Mana Island Airport – Mana Island
 NFMO (MFJ) – Moala Airport – Moala
 NFNA (SUV) – Nausori International Airport (Luvuluvu) – Suva, Viti Levu
 NFNB (LEV) – Levuka Airfield – Bureta
 NFND (PHR) – Pacific Harbour/Deuba Seaplane Base – Pacific Harbour / Deuba, Viti Levu
 NFNG (NGI) – Gau Airport – Gau Island
 NFNH (LUC) – Laucala Airport – Laucala (Lauthala Island)
 NFNK (LKB) – Lakeba Airport – Lakeba (Lakemba)
 NFNL (LBS) – Labasa Airport – Labasa (Lambasa), Vanua Levu
 NFNM (TVU) – Matei Airport (Taveuni Island Airport) – Matei, Taveuni
 NFNO (KXF) – Koro Airport – Koro
 NFNR (RTA) – Rotuma Airport – Rotuma
 NFNS (SVU) – Savusavu Airport – Savusavu
 NFNU (BVF) – Dama Airport – Bua, Vanua Levu
 NFNV (VAU) – Vatukoula Airport – Vatukoula, Viti Levu
 NFNW (KAY) – Wakaya Airport – Wakaya
 NFOL (ONU) – Ono-i-Lau Airport – Ono-i-Lau
 NFSW (YAS) – Yasawa Island Airport – Yasawa
 NFVB (VBV) – Vanuabalavu Airport – Vanua Balavu (Vanuabalavu)
 NFVL (VTF) – Vatulele Airport – Vatulele

Tonga

 NFTE (EUA) – ʻEua Airport (Kaufana Airport) – ʻEua
 NFTF (TBU) – Fuaamotu International Airport – Nukualofa, Tongatapu
 NFTL (HPA) – Lifuka Island Airport (Salote Pilolevu Airport) – Lifuka, Ha'apai
 NFTO (NFO) – Niuafo'ou Airport (Kuini Lavinia Airport) – Niuafo'ou
 NFTP (NTT) – Niuatoputapu Airport (Mata'aho Airport) – Niuatoputapu
 NFTV (VAV) – Vava'u International Airport (Lupepau'u Airport) – Vava'u

NG - Kiribati (western – Gilbert Islands), Tuvalu

Kiribati (western – Gilbert Islands)

 NGAB (ABF) – Abaiang Airport – Abaiang
 NGBR (BEZ) – Beru Airport – Beru Island
 NGKT (KUC) – Kuria Airfield – Kuria
 NGMA (MNK) – Maiana Airfield – Maiana
 NGMK (MZK) – Marakei Airport – Marakei
 NGMN (MTK) – Makin Airport – Makin
 NGNU (NIG) – Nikunau Airport – Nikunau
 NGON (OOT) – Onotoa Airport – Onotoa
 NGTA (TRW) – Bonriki International Airport – Tarawa
 NGTB (AEA) – Abemama Airport – Abemama
 NGTE (TBF) – Tabiteuea North Airport – Tabiteuea North
 NGTM (TMN) – Tamana Airport – Tamana
 NGTO (NON) – Nonouti Airport – Nonouti
 NGTR (AIS) – Arorae Airport – Arorae
 NGTS (TSU) – Tabiteuea South Airport – Tabiteuea South
 NGTU (BBG) – Butaritari Airport – Butaritari
 NGUK (AAK) – Aranuka Airport – Aranuka

Tuvalu

 NGFU (FUN) – Funafuti International Airport – Funafuti

NI - Niue 

 NIUE (IUE) – Niue Hanan International Airport – Alofi

NL - Wallis and Futuna 

 NLWF (FUT) – Futuna - Pointe Vele Airport (Maopoop Airport) – Futuna Island
 NLWW (WLS) – Hihifo Airport – Wallis Island

NS - Samoa, American Samoa

Samoa

 NSAU (AAU) – Asau Airport – Asau
 NSFA (APW) – Faleolo International Airport – Apia
 NSFI (FGI) – Fagali'i Airport – Fagali'i
 NSMA (MXS) – Maota Airport – Salelologa

American Samoa

 NSAS (OFU) – Ofu Airport – Ofu Island
 NSFQ (FAQ) – Fitiuta Airport – Fitiuta
 NSTU (PPG) – Pago Pago International Airport (Tafuna Airport)  – Pago Pago

NT - French Polynesia 

 NTAA (PPT) – Faa'a International Airport – Faa'a, Tahiti
 NTAR (RUR) – Rurutu Airport – Rurutu, Austral Islands
 NTAT (TUB) – Tubuai - Mataura Airport – Tubuai, Austral Islands
 NTAV (RVV) – Raivavae Airport – Raivavae, Austral Islands
 NTGA (AAA) – Anaa Airport – Anaa, Tuamotus
 NTGB (FGU) – Fangatau Airport – Fangatau, Tuamotus
 NTGC (TIH) – Tikehau Airport – Tikehau, Tuamotus
 NTGD (APK) – Apataki Airport – Apataki, Tuamotus
 NTGE (REA) – Reao Airport – Reao, Tuamotus
 NTGF (FAV) – Fakarava Airport – Fakarava, Tuamotus
 NTGG (FAV) – Nengonengo Airstrip – Nengonengo, Tuamotus
 NTGH (HHZ) – Hikueru Airport – Hikueru, Tuamotus
 NTGI (XMH) – Manihi Airport – Manihi, Tuamotus
 NTGJ (GMR) – Totegegie Airport – Totegegie, Gambier Islands
 NTGK (KKR) – Kaukura Airport – Kaukura Atoll
 NTGM (MKP) – Makemo Airport – Makemo, Tuamotus
 NTGN (NAU) – Napuka Airport – Napuka, Disappointment Islands
 NTGO (TKV) – Tatakoto Airport – Tatakoto
 NTGP (PKP) – Puka-Puka Airport – Puka-Puka, Tuamotus
 NTGQ (PUK) – Pukarua Airport – Pukarua, Tuamotus
 NTGT (TKP) – Takapoto Airport – Takapoto, Tuamotus
 NTGU (AXR) – Arutua Airport – Arutua
 NTGV (MVT) – Mataiva Airport – Mataiva, Tuamotus
 NTGW (NUK) – Nukutavake Airport – Nukutavake
 NTGY (ZTA) – Tureia Airport – Tureia (Papahena)
 NTHE (AHE) – Ahe Airport – Ahe
 NTKA (KHZ) – Kauehi Aerodrome – Kauehi (Putake)
 NTKF (FAC) – Faaite Airport – Faaite (Faaiti)
 NTKH (FHZ) – Faahina Airport – Fakahina
 NTKN – Niau Airport – Niau
 NTKO (RRR) – Raroia Airport – Raroia
 NTKR (TKX) – Takaroa Airport – Takaroa
 NTMD (NHV) – Nuku Hiva Airport – Nuku Hiva, Marquesas Islands
 NTMN (AUQ) – Atuona Airport – Hiva Oa, Marquesas Islands
 NTMP (UAP) – Ua Pou Airport – Ua Pou, Marquesas Islands
 NTMU (UAH) – Ua Huka Airport – Ua Huka, Marquesas Islands
 NTTB (BOB) – Bora Bora Airport (Motu-Mute Airport) – Bora Bora, located on Moto Mute
 NTTE (TTI) – Tetiꞌaroa Airstrip – Tetiꞌaroa, Society Islands
 NTTG (RGI) – Rangiroa Airport – Rangiroa, Tuamotus
 NTTH (HUH) – Huahine - Fare Airport – Huahine, Leeward Islands (Society Islands)
 NTTM (MOZ) – Moorea Airport – Moorea, Windward Islands (Society Islands)
 NTTO (HOI) – Hao Airport – Hao Island
 NTTP (MAU) – Maupiti Airport – Maupiti
 NTTR (RFP) – Raiatea Airport (Uturoa Airport) – Raiatea, Society Islands
 NTUV (VHZ) – Vahitahi Airport – Vahitahi

NV - Vanuatu 

 NVSA (MTV) – Mota Lava Airport (Valua Airport) – Mota Lava
 NVSC (SLH) – Vanua Lava Airport – Sola
 NVSD (TOH) – Torres Airport – Linua
 NVSE (EAE) – Siwo Airport (Aromai Airport) – Émaé
 NVSF (CCV) – Craig Cove Airport – Craig Cove, Ambrym
 NVSG (LOD) – Longana Airport – Longana
 NVSH (SSR) – Sara Airport – Sara
 NVSI (PBJ) – Paama Airport – Paama
 NVSL (LPM) – Malekoula Airport – Lamap
 NVSM (LNB) – Lamen Bay Airport – Lamen Bay, Epi
 NVSN (MWF) – Maewo-Naone Airport – Maewo
 NVSO (LNE) – Lonorore Airport – Lonorore
 NVSP (NUS) – Norsup Airport – Norsup
 NVSQ (ZGU) – Gaua Airport – Gaua
 NVSR (RCL) – Redcliff Airport – Redcliff
 NVSS (SON) – Santo-Pekoa International Airport – Luganville, Espiritu Santo
 NVST (TGH) – Tongoa Airport – Tongoa
 NVSU (ULB) – Ulei Airport – Ulei, Ambrym
 NVSV (VLS) – Valesdir Airport – Valesdir, Epi
 NVSW (WLH) – Walaha Airport – Walaha, Ambae
 NVSX (SWJ) – South West Bay Airport – South West Bay, Malakula
 NVSZ (OLJ) – Olpoi Airport – Olpoi, Espiritu Santo
 NVVA (AUY) – Anatom Airport (Aneityum Airport) – Aneityum
 NVVB (AWD) – Aniwa Airport – Aniwa
 NVVD (DLY) – Dillon's Bay Airport – Dillon's Bay, Erromango
 NVVF (FTA) – Futuna Airport – Futuna
 NVVI (IPA) – Ipota Airport – Ipota
 NVVQ (UIQ) – Quoin Hill Airport – Quoin Hill
 NVVV (VLI) – Bauerfield International Airport – Port Vila
 NVVW (TAH) – Whitegrass Airport – Tanna

NW - New Caledonia 

 NWWA (TGJ) – Tiga Airport – Tiga Island
 NWWB – Bourail - Poe Airport – Bourail
 NWWC (BMY) – Île Art - Waala Airport (Belep Islands Airport) – Waala, Belep
 NWWD (KNQ) – Kone Airport – Koné
 NWWE (ILP) – Île des Pins Airport – L'Île-des-Pins
 NWWH (HLU) – Nesson Airport – Houailou
 NWWI (HNG) – Hienghène Airport – Hienghène
 NWWK (KOC) – Koumac Airport – Koumac
 NWWL (LIF) – Ouanaham Airport (Wanaham Airport) – Lifou
 NWWM (GEA) – Nouméa Magenta Airport – Nouméa
 NWWO (IOU) – Ile Ouen/Edmond Cane Airport – Ile Ouen
 NWWP (PUV) – Malabou Airport – Poum
 NWWQ (PDC) – Mueo/Nickel Airport – Nepoui
 NWWR (MEE) – Maré Airport – Maré
 NWWT – La Foa - Oua Tom Airport – La Foa
 NWWU (TOU) – Touho Airport – Touho
 NWWV (UVE) – Ouvéa Airport – Ouvéa
 NWWW (NOU) – La Tontouta International Airport – Nouméa
 NWWX – Canala Airport – Canala

NZ - New Zealand 

 NZ0B – Palmer Station blue ice runway – Antarctica
 NZAA (AKL) – Auckland Airport – Auckland
 NZAL – Avalon Heliport – Lower Hutt, Wellington
 NZAP (TUO) – Taupo Airport – Taupo
 NZAR (AMZ) – Ardmore Airport – Auckland
 NZAS (ASG) – Ashburton Aerodrome – Ashburton
 NZBA – Balclutha Aerodrome – Balclutha
 NZBC – ASB Bank Centre Heliport – Auckland
 NZBW – Burwood Hospital Heliport – Christchurch
 NZCH (CHC) – Christchurch Airport – Christchurch
 NZCI (CHT) – Chatham Islands / Tuuta Airport – Chatham Islands
 NZCS – Cromwell Racecourse Aerodrome – Cromwell
 NZCX (CMV) – Coromandel Aerodrome – Coromandel Peninsula, North Island
 NZDA (DGR) – Dargaville Aerodrome – Dargaville
 NZDC – Dunedin City Heliport – Dunedin
 NZDH – Dunedin Hospital Heliport – Dunedin
 NZDN (DUD) – Dunedin International Airport – Mosgiel, Dunedin
 NZDV – Dannevirke Aerodrome – Dannevirke
 NZFF – Forest Field Aerodrome – Rangiora
 NZFI – Feilding Aerodrome – Feilding
 NZFJ – Franz Josef Aerodrome – Franz Josef / Waiau
 NZFP – Foxpine Aerodrome – Foxton
 NZFX – Phoenix Airfield – Antarctica
 NZGA – Galatea Aerodrome – Galatea
 NZGB (GBZ) – Great Barrier Aerodrome – Great Barrier Island
 NZGC – Gore Aerodrome (Charlton Aerodrome) – Gore
 NZGI – Garden City Heliport – Christchurch
 NZGM (GMN) – Greymouth Airport – Greymouth
 NZGR – Great Mercury Aerodrome – Mercury Islands
 NZGS (GIS) – Gisborne Airport – Gisborne
 NZGT (GTN) – Glentanner Aerodrome – Lake Pukaki
 NZGY – Glenorchy Aerodrome – Glenorchy
 NZHA – Hāwera Aerodrome – Hāwera
 NZHK (HKK) – Hokitika Airport – Hokitika
 NZHN (HLZ) – Hamilton Airport – Hamilton
 NZHR – Hanmer Springs Aerodrome – Hanmer Springs
 NZHS – Hastings Aerodrome – Hastings
 NZHT – Haast Aerodrome – Haast
 NZIR – McMurdo Sea ice runway – Antarctica
 NZJA – Tauranga Hospital Heliport – Tauranga
 NZJC – Christchurch Hospital Heliport – Christchurch
 NZJE – Dargaville Hospital Heliport – Dargaville
 NZJG – Gisborne Hospital Heliport – Gisborne
 NZJH – Hastings Hospital Heliport – Hastings
 NZJI – Bay of Islands Heliport – Kerikeri
 NZJK – Kaitaia Hospital Heliport – Kaitaia
 NZJL – Auckland Hospital Heliport – Auckland
 NZJM – Palmerston North Hospital Heliport – Palmerston North
 NZJO – Rotorua Hospital Heliport – Rotorua
 NZJQ – Taranaki Base Hospital Heliport – New Plymouth
 NZJR – Whangarei Hospital Heliport – Whangarei
 NZJS – Southland/Kew Hospital Heliport – Invercargill
 NZJT – Taumarunui Hospital Heliport – Taumarunui
 NZJU – Wanganui Hospital Heliport – Whanganui
 NZJY – Wairoa Hospital Heliport – Wairoa
 NZJZ – Taupo Hospital Heliport – Taupo
 NZKE – Waiheke Island Aerodrome – Waiheke Island
 NZKF – Kaipara Flats Aerodrome – Kaipara Flats
 NZKI (KBZ) – Kaikoura Aerodrome – Kaikoura
 NZKK (KKE) – Kerikeri/Bay of Islands Airport – Kerikeri / Bay of Islands
 NZKM – Karamea Aerodrome – Karamea
 NZKO (KKO) – Kaikohe Aerodrome – Kaikohe
 NZKT (KAT) – Kaitaia Airport – Kaitaia
 NZLX (ALR) – Alexandra Aerodrome – Alexandra
 NZMA (MTA) – Matamata Airport – Matamata
 NZMB – Mechanics Bay Heliport – Auckland
 NZMC (MON) – Mount Cook Aerodrome – Aoraki / Mount Cook
 NZME – Mercer Airfield – Mercer
 NZMF (MFN) – Milford Sound Airport – Milford Sound
 NZMH – Masterton Hospital Heliport – Masterton
 NZMK (MZP) – Motueka Aerodrome – Motueka
 NZMO (TEU) – Te Anau Airport – Te Anau / Manapouri
 NZMR – Murchison Aerodrome – Murchison
 NZMS (MRO) – Hood Aerodrome – Masterton
 NZMT – Martinborough Aerodrome – Martinborough
 NZMW – Makarora Aerodrome – Makarora
 NZNE – North Shore Aerodrome (Dairy Flat Airstrip) – Dairy Flat, Auckland
 NZNH – Nelson Hospital Heliport – Nelson
 NZNP (NPL) – New Plymouth Airport – New Plymouth
 NZNR (NPE) – Hawke's Bay Airport – Napier
 NZNS (NSN) – Nelson Airport – Nelson
 NZNV (IVC) – Invercargill Airport – Invercargill
 NZOA – Omarama Airfield – Omarama
 NZOH (OHA) – Ohakea Airbase (RNZAF) – Ohakea
 NZOI – Motiti Island Aerodrome – Tauranga
 NZOM – Omaka Aerodrome – Blenheim
 NZOP – Opotiki Aerodrome – Opotiki
 NZOU (OAM) – Oamaru Airport – Oamaru
 NZOX – Okiwi Airfield – Okiwi, Great Barrier Island
 NZPA – Paihia Heliport – Paihia
 NZPG – Pegasus Field – Antarctica Closed December 2016
 NZPI – West Auckland Airport – Parakai
 NZPM (PMR) – Palmerston North International Airport – Palmerston North
 NZPN (PCN) – Picton Aerodrome – Picton - Koromiko
 NZPP (PPQ) – Kapiti Coast Airport – Paraparaumu
 NZQN (ZQN) – Queenstown Airport – Queenstown
 NZQW – Queens Wharf Heliport – Wellington
 NZRA (RAG) – Raglan Airfield – Raglan
 NZRC (SZS) – Ryans Creek Aerodrome – Halfmoon Bay, Stewart Island
 NZRK – Rangitaiki Aerodrome – Rangitaiki
 NZRO (ROT) – Rotorua Airport – Rotorua
 NZRT – Rangiora Airfield – Rangiora
 NZRU – Waiouru Airfield (NZ Army) – Waiouru
 NZRW – Ruawai Airfield – Ruawai
 NZRX – Roxburgh Aerodrome – Roxburgh
 NZSD – Stratford Aerodrome – Stratford
 NZSP – Amundsen–Scott South Pole Station – Antarctica
 NZTG (TRG) – Tauranga Airport – Tauranga
 NZTH (TMZ) – Thames Aerodrome – Thames
 NZTI – Taieri Aerodrome – Dunedin
 NZTK (KTF) – Takaka Aerodrome – Takaka
 NZTL – Lake Tekapo Airport – Tekapo
 NZTM – Taumarunui Aerodrome – Taumarunui
 NZTN – Tūrangi Airport – Tūrangi
 NZTO (TKZ) – Tokoroa Aerodrome – Tokoroa
 NZTT – Te Kuiti Airfield – Te Kuiti
 NZTU (TIU) – Richard Pearse Airport – Timaru
 NZTZ – Te Anau Aerodrome – Te Anau (defunct - replaced with NZMO)
 NZUK (TWZ) – Pukaki Aerodrome – Twizel
 NZUN – Pauanui Aerodrome – Pauanui
 NZVL – Mandeville Aerodrome – Mandeville, Gore
 NZVR – Taihape Airport – Taihape
 NZWB (BHE) – Woodbourne Airport – Blenheim (ICAO code also listed as NZBM)
 NZWD – Williams Field – Antarctica
 NZWF (WKA) – Wānaka Airport – Wānaka
 NZWG – Wigram Aerodrome – Christchurch Closed March 2009
 NZWH – Wellington Hospital Heliport – Wellington
 NZWK (WHK) – Whakatāne Airport – Whakatāne
 NZWM – Waimate Aerodrome – Waimate
 NZWN (WLG) – Wellington International Airport – Wellington
 NZWO (WIR) – Wairoa Aerodrome – Wairoa
 NZWP – RNZAF Base Auckland – Auckland
 NZWR (WRE) – Whangarei Airport – Whangarei
 NZWL (WML) – West Melton Aerodrome – West Melton
 NZWS (WSZ) – Westport Airport – Westport
 NZWT (WTZ) – Whitianga Aerodrome – Whitianga
 NZWU (WAG) – Whanganui Airport – Whanganui
 NZWV – Waihi Beach Aerodrome – Waihi Beach
 NZYP – Waipukurau Aerodrome – Waipukurau

References

 
  - includes IATA codes
 Aviation Safety Network - IATA and ICAO airport codes
 

N
Airports by ICAO code
Airports by ICAO codeNew Zealand transport-related lists
Airports by ICAO code
Airports by ICAO codeamoa